Myrna Yvonne Smith (May 28, 1941 – December 24, 2010) was an American songwriter and singer.

Smith became a high school English teacher in South Brunswick, New Jersey in the 1960s, while she also pursued her singing career. She became a member of the Sweet Inspirations, which previously served as Elvis Presley's backing group. When she joined, the lead singer of the Sweet Inspirations was Cissy Houston, the mother of Whitney Houston and dynamic soprano featured on Aretha Franklin's "Ain't No Way".

Smith later married Jerry Schilling, a friend and associate of Elvis who subsequently also managed the Beach Boys at one point.

In the early 1980s, she co-wrote all of the songs on Carl Wilson's 1981 solo album Carl Wilson, as well as a few of the songs on his 1983 solo album Youngblood, and Wilson's contributions to The Beach Boys' self-titled 1985 album.

While performing on the "Elvis: The Concert" European tour in March 2010, Smith developed pneumonia which eventually led to kidney failure and a stroke. She died on December 24, 2010, in Canoga Park, California, after an illness, five months short of her 70th birthday.

References

External links 
Hitmakingteam.com
Myrna Yvonne Smith at Findagrave

1941 births
2010 deaths
American women singers
American rhythm and blues singers
American gospel singers
American session musicians
Songwriters from California
Deaths from kidney failure
21st-century American women
The Sweet Inspirations members